Mingo County Airport  is a former public use airport located one nautical mile (2 km) northeast of the central business district of Williamson, a city in Mingo County, West Virginia, United States. It is owned by the Mingo County Airport Authority. This airport was included in the National Plan of Integrated Airport Systems for 2011–2015, which categorized it as a general aviation facility.

It was replaced in 2012 by the Appalachian Regional Airport, also owned by the Mingo County Airport Authority.

Facilities and aircraft 
Mingo County Airport covers an area of 150 acres (61 ha) at an elevation of 1,575 feet (480 m) above mean sea level. It has one runway designated 6/24 with an asphalt surface measuring 3,515 by 60 feet (1,071 x 18 m).

For the 12-month period ending December 31, 2010, the airport had 4,520 aircraft operations, an average of 12 per day: 99.6% general aviation and 0.4% military. At that time there were 11 aircraft based at this airport, all single-engine.

References

External links 
 Aerial image as of March 1995 from USGS The National Map
 

Airports in West Virginia
Transportation in Mingo County, West Virginia
Defunct airports in the United States